John Wastall (23 June 1928 – 28 October 2002) was a British sailor. He competed in the Star event at the 1972 Summer Olympics.

References

External links
 

1928 births
2002 deaths
German male sailors (sport)
Olympic sailors of Great Britain
Sailors at the 1972 Summer Olympics – Star
Sportspeople from London